General elections were held in Malta between 1 and 4 December 1875.

Background
The elections were held under the 1849 constitution, which provided for an 18-member Government Council, of which ten members would be appointed and eight elected.

Results
A total of 2,570 people were registered to vote, of which 2,047 cast votes, giving a turnout of 80%.

References

General elections in Malta
1875
1875 in Malta
December 1875 events